The following article is about players who have appeared for Queens Park Rangers Football Club. Since playing their first competitive match as a professional club, more than 1,100 players have made a competitive first-team appearance for the club, of whom 180 players have made at least 100 appearances (including substitute appearances); those players are listed here.
 
The vast majority of the players who have played a hundred times or more for QPR are from England, with 35 players either coming from or played internationally for other countries. Seventeen of those foreign players come from one of the other Home Nations of the UK, seven players come from elsewhere in Europe, two from South America, two from Africa, five from the Caribbean islands, and two from North America. There are no players in the list from either Asia or Australasia.

Queens Park Rangers' record appearance-maker is Tony Ingham, who made 555 appearances in his QPR career between 1950 and 1963. Nine other players have made more than 400 appearances, the most recent being Kevin Gallen, who has made the ninth-highest number of appearances with 414 matches, scoring 104 goals in the process. George Goddard is the club's top goalscorer with 186 goals in his seven years with the club. Other than Goddard and Gallen, only Brian Bedford, Rodney Marsh and Don Givens have scored more than 100 goals for the club. As of 11 August 2017, 180 players have appeared 100 times or more for QPR, 34 have played 250 or more and 10 players 400 or more games.

Key
Appearances and goals are for first-team competitive matches only, including Premier League, Football League, FA Cup, League Cup, Football League Third Division South Cup, FA Charity/Community Shield, UEFA Cup, Southern League, Southern Professional Charity Cup, Western League, London Challenge Cup, Southern Floodlight Cup, Full Members Cup, Mercantile Credit Centenary Trophy and Football League Trophy matches. As the team's historian, Gordon Macey, lists the statistics from wartime matches such as the two London Combination leagues, the Wartime League and the Football League War Cup as well as the abandoned 1939–40 season; they are included even though they are normally considered unofficial.

Key
 Name – The name of the player, sorted by last name.
 Nationality – If a player played international football, the country he played for is shown. Otherwise, the player's nationality is given as their country of birth.
 QPR career – The year of the player's first appearance for Queens Park Rangers to the year of his last appearance.
 Starts – The number of games started.
 Subs – The number of games played as a substitute. Substitutions were only introduced to the Football League in the 1960s.
 Total – The total number of games played, both as a starter and as a substitute.
 Goals – The number of goals scored by the player in both games started and substitute appearances.

Positions are listed according to the tactical formations that were employed at the time. Thus the change in the names of defense and midfield reflects the tactical evolution that occurred from the 1960s onwards.
Players still active for Queens Park Rangers are in bold.
Statistics are correct as of 12 February 2023.

Players

References
General

Specific

External links

Queens Park Rangers F.C. official website

Players
 
Lists of association football players by club in England
Association football player non-biographical articles